5-MeO-DPT (also known as 5-methoxy-N,N-Dipropyltryptamine), is a psychedelic and entheogenic designer drug.

Chemistry
The full chemical name is N-[2-(5-methoxy-1H-indol-3-yl)ethyl]-N-propylpropan-1-amine. It is classified as a tryptamine derivative.

Effects
Little is known about the subjective effects of 5-MeO-DPT, but the nature of the compound is probably comparable to 5-MeO-DiPT, 5-MeO-DMT, or DPT, which are also psychedelic tryptamines/indoles. However, the duration of the above-mentioned drugs vary considerably.

Dosage
5-MeO-DPT is orally active, with 3-10 mg representing a fully effective dosage for most users.  Effects begin within three hours, and usually last 4 hours.

Legality
In the United States 5-MeO-DPT is considered a schedule 1 controlled substance as a positional isomer of 5-Methoxy-N,N-diisopropyltryptamine (5-MeO-DiPT)

See also
 5-MeO-DALT
 5-MeO-DET
 5-MeO-DBT
 5-MeO-EPT

References

External links
 5-MeO-DET TiHKAL Entry on Erowid, mentioning 5-MeO-DPT
 5-MeO-DPT on Erowid

Mexamines
Psychedelic tryptamines
Designer drugs